Wang Qunbin (born 1969) is a Chinese billionaire businessman. He was appointed co-chairman of Fosun International in February 2020, and was CEO of Fosun from March 2017 to February 2020, when he replaced Liang Xinjun.

He earned a bachelor's degree in genetic engineering from Fudan University, Shanghai in 1991.

He is one of the founders of Fosun, and has been a director since 1994, and president from 2009 to 2017.

He lives in Shanghai, China.

References

1969 births
Living people
21st-century Chinese businesspeople
Billionaires from Shanghai
Chinese company founders
Chinese investors
Fosun International people
Fudan University alumni